Peak 9980 is a mountain in the Sierra Nevada of Tulare County, California.

References

Mountains of the Sierra Nevada (United States)
Mountains of Tulare County, California
Mountains of Northern California
North American 3000 m summits